Bob Powell (27 April 1902 – 25 February 1976) was a New Zealand cricketer. He played in two first-class match for Canterbury in 1922/23.

See also
 List of Canterbury representative cricketers

References

External links
 

1902 births
1976 deaths
New Zealand cricketers
Canterbury cricketers
Cricketers from Sydney